Liu Xia (born January 6, 1979, in Qingdao, Shandong) is a female Chinese judoka. She was the silver medalist in the -78 kg category at the 2004 Athens Olympics. She was the 2003 Summer Universiade gold medalist and won her first continental title at the 2007 Asian Judo Championships.

Achievements

References

External links
 
 

1979 births
Living people
Chinese female judoka
Olympic judoka of China
Olympic silver medalists for China
Olympic medalists in judo
Judoka at the 2004 Summer Olympics
Medalists at the 2004 Summer Olympics
Universiade medalists in judo
Universiade gold medalists for China
Medalists at the 2003 Summer Universiade
Sportspeople from Qingdao
20th-century Chinese women
21st-century Chinese women